The Nine-Hour Movement started in Canada in 1872, based out of Hamilton, Ontario. This marked Canada's first national attempt at a labour movement, pushing for the nine-hour work day which united both unionized and non-unionized workers alike. The movement came to its height in May 1872 when a collective force of 1,500 workers demonstrated in Hamilton in a parade-style fashion, which is coined as being the precursor to the traditional holiday of Canada's Labour Day. The movement was an overall failure, as it failed to deliver the nine-hour work day to most workforces and industries, but made a major mark in labour relations in Canada.

Despite its defeat, the movement created a unified protest and fueled workers to fight to secure rights through legal measures of labour law. The movement indicated that labour had a public presence and that its interests, institutions, and political stances reflected its unique social position and economic needs. A major victory was gained when Sir John A. Macdonald passed the Trade Unions Act on June 14, 1872, which gave workers the right to associate in trade unions. In addition, other minor victories were achieved in repealing repressive labour legislation and the passage of laws that strengthened the workers' hand against employers.

The Nine-Hour Movement is also a major factor that propelled the development of the Canadian Labour Union. Three prominent reasons for the failure of the Nine-Hour Movement were employer hostility and resistance, the waning prosperity of various industries, and significant divisions in the labour force (ex. race/gender differences).

References

Labour history of Canada